I am Legend is a South Korean television series starring Kim Jung-eun that was broadcast on SBS on August 2 to September 21, 2010.

Synopsis
Jeon Seol-hee (Kim Jung-eun) files for divorce after realizing that she deserves to be treated better by her unappreciative lawyer husband, Cha Ji-wook (Kim Seung-soo) and his snobbish family. Determined to get her life back on track, she returns to her rock band roots, becoming the leader of the Comeback Madonna Band. Her bandmates are fellow "ajummas" who have personal problems of their own, and together they search for happiness and personal fulfillment through music.

Cast

Main characters
 Kim Jung-eun as Jeon Seol-hee
 Lee Joon-hyuk as Jang Tae-hyun 
 Kim Seung-soo as Cha Ji-wook 
 Jang Shin-young as Kang Soo-in 
 Hong Ji-min as Lee Hwa-ja 
 Hyun Jyu-ni as Yang Ah-reum
 Ko Eun-mi as Kang Ran-hee
 Jang Young-nam as Oh Seung-hye

Supporting characters
 Cha Hwa-yeon as Mrs. Hong 
 Park Young-ji as District Attorney Cha
 Yoon Joo-hee as Jeon Jae-hee
 Kim Dong-hyun as Jang Noo-ri
 Kim Myung-gook as Yang Kwang-yeol
 Jung Suk-yong as Gong Deok-soo
 Kim Joon-hyung as Han Min-kyu
 Jang Hang-sun as Go Jin-bae
 Seo Jin-wook as judge
 U-KISS as Kiss Band
 Bye Bye Sea as Soo-in's boyband trainees
 Im Hyun-sik as President Beon Young-ho
 Baek Seung-hyeon as Young-nal (supermarket employee)
 Ha Seung-ri as Jo Eun-ji
 Teen Top as Themselves (cameo)
 Kim Hee-chul as Himself (cameo in episode 15)

Soundtrack
The series featured real musical performances from the fictional Comeback Madonna Band – comprised by actresses Kim Jung-eun (vocals and rhythm guitar), Juni (lead guitar), Hong Ji-min (bass) and Jang Shin-young (drums). The original songs "Comeback Madonna" and "You" are included in the soundtrack, as well as several modernized rock covers of famous pop songs from the 1980s and 1990s that the band performed in the show. Comeback Madonna Band also performed live at the Pentaport Rock Festival and Jecheon International Music & Film Festival.

The official soundtrack was released on August 31, 2010 through LOEN Entertainment.

 컴백마돈나 (Comeback Madonna) – Comeback Madonna Band
 백만송이장미 (A Million Roses) – Comeback Madonna Band
 그대가 (You) – Lee Joon-hyuk
 Killing Me Softly – Comeback Madonna Band
 회상 (Reminiscence) – Kim Jung-eun
 사랑사랑사랑 (Love Love Love) – Comeback Madonna Band
 기분 좋은 날 (A Fine Day) – Comeback Madonna Band
 그대가 (You) – Kim Jung-eun & Lee Joon-hyuk (Duet ver.)
 황홀한 고백 (A Blissful Confession) – Comeback Madonna Band
 뮤지컬 (Musical) – Hong Ji-min
 사랑은 빗물처럼 사랑은 늘 그렇게 (Love, Love is Always So, Like Rain Water) – Go Eun-mi
 너에게 Dear music (To You, Dear Music) – Kim Jung-eun

References

External links
I Am Legend official SBS website 

Seoul Broadcasting System television dramas
2010 South Korean television series debuts
2010 South Korean television series endings
Korean-language television shows
South Korean musical television series
Television series by AStory